Paralepetopsis lepichoni is a species of sea snail, a true limpet, a marine gastropod mollusk in the family Neolepetopsidae, one of the families of true limpets. It is part of the subclass of Gastropoda called Vetigastropoda.

Description
P. lepichoni does not develop apical cusps.

Distribution
P. lepichoni was discovered in Nankai Trough off south-eastern Honshu, Japan.

References

External links
 Warén A. & Bouchet P. (2001). Gastropoda and Monoplacophora from hydrothermal vents and seeps new taxa and records. The Veliger, 44(2): 116-231

Neolepetopsidae
Gastropods described in 2001